Schnürpflingen is a municipality in the district of Alb-Donau in Baden-Württemberg in Germany.

Mayors

1945-1976:	Alfred Jans
1976-1986:	Jürgen Guse
1986–2010: Manfred Häberle
2010–current: Michael Knoll (independent)

References

Towns in Baden-Württemberg
Alb-Donau-Kreis
Württemberg